Tzeirei Rahat,  is an Israeli football club based in the Bedouin city of Rahat. The club is currently in Liga Bet South B division.

History
The club was founded in 1996 and started at Liga Gimel, the fifth and lowest tier of Israeli football (the sixth from 1999 to 2009). In the 1999–2000 season, Tzeirei Rahat finished runners-up in Liga Gimel South division, after local rivals, Hapoel Rahat, and were eventually promoted to Liga Bet after vacancies were created in the South B division. After two seasons in Liga Bet, the club finished third bottom in their division at the 2001–02 season, and dropped back to Liga Gimel. However, three seasons later, the club made a return to Liga Bet, where they play ever since.

The club's best placing to date came at the 2009–10 Liga Bet, when they finished third in Liga Bet South B division and qualified for the Promotion play-offs, where they beat F.C. Dimona 2–0 in the first round, and lost to Ironi Ramla 4–5 after extra time, in the second round.

Season History

Honours

Cups

References

External links
F.C. Tzeirei Rahat The Israel Football Association 

Arab Israeli culture
Bedouins in Israel
Association football clubs established in 1996
1996 establishments in Israel
Rahat
Rahat
Arab-Israeli football clubs